Bienvenida de Sánchez was a Paraguayan politician. In 1963 she and Dolores de Miño became the first female members of the Chamber of Deputies.

Biography
De Sánchez joined the Colorado Party and became chair of its central women's commission. She was a Colorado Party candidate in the 1963 elections and was elected to the Chamber of Deputies, becoming one of the first two female members alongside Dolores de Miño.

References

Members of the Chamber of Deputies of Paraguay
Paraguayan women in politics
Colorado Party (Paraguay) politicians
Possibly living people